NKG2-C type II integral membrane protein or NKG2C is a protein that in humans is encoded by the KLRC2 gene.

Function 

Natural killer (NK) cells are lymphocytes that can mediate lysis of certain tumor cells and virus-infected cells without previous activation. They can also regulate specific humoral and cell-mediated immunity. NK cells preferentially express several calcium-dependent (C-type) lectins, which have been implicated in the regulation of NK cell function. The group, designated KLRC (NKG2) are expressed primarily in natural killer (NK) cells and encodes a family of transmembrane proteins characterized by a type II membrane orientation (extracellular C terminus) and the presence of a C-type lectin domain. The KLRC (NKG2) gene family is located within the NK complex, a region that contains several C-type lectin genes preferentially expressed on NK cells. KLRC2 alternative splice variants have been described but their full-length nature has not been determined.

Interactions 

KLRC2 has been shown to interact and form dimers with CD94. The CD94/NKG2C heterodimer can bind to HLA-E and this binding leads to NK cells activation.

During infection with human cytomegalovirus, peptides derived from the virus are presented on HLA-E and natural killer cells that express the CD94/NKG2C receptor can specifically recognise the virus peptides. This recognition leads to activation, expansion, and differentiation of adaptive NK cells.

See also 
 Cluster of differentiation

References

Further reading 

 
 
 
 
 
 
 
 
 
 
 
 
 

Clusters of differentiation